Robert Rutherford Holt (born December 27, 1917) is an American psychologist. He worked in psychoanalytic theory.

Holt was born on December 27, 1917. He received a BA in 1939 from Princeton University, and MA in 1941 and a PhD in 1944, both from Harvard University.

He received the Bruno Klopfer Award in 1969. He turned 100 in December 2017.

References 

1917 births
Living people
21st-century American psychologists
American centenarians
Men centenarians
Harvard University alumni
Princeton University alumni
20th-century American psychologists